Chris Hardwick (born 1971) is an American comedian.

Chris Hardwick may also refer to:

Chris Hardwick (speedcuber) (born 1983), American competitive speedcuber
Chris Hardwick (priest) (born 1957), British religious leader

See also
Hardwick (disambiguation)